Bolshoe Podberezye (Olı Podberezye or Күлле ил, Külle il) is a village in Kaybitsky District, Republic of Tatarstan, Russia. It is the administrative center of Bolshepodberezinskoe municipal unit.

Geography 
Located on the river Birlya (left tributary of Sviyaga), 18 km south-west of the regional center - Bolshiye Kaybitsy.

History  
The village is founded in the second half of 16th century. 
It was a center of Podberzye district in 1944–56.

Population  
 1989 – 860 
 1997 – 878
 2010 – 730

Ethic composition  
 In the year of 2002: Russians – 93%, Tatars – 4%, Chuvash people – 3%
 In the year of 2010: Russians – 92%, Tatars – 4%, Chuvash people – 3%, there are also Tajiks and Azerbaijanis.

Infrastructure 
Middle school founded in 1836
People connected with the village
In this village Andrey Koshkin, a Hero of the Soviet Union.

References 

Rural localities in Kaybitsky District
Sviyazhsky Uyezd